Carrefour de Lodéon is a French daily classical music radio program by public radio station France Inter and France Musique since September 2014 and hosted by Frédéric Lodéon. It has been broadcast since 1992 from Monday to Thursday from 4pm to 5pm (CST) from 1992 to 2014, then from 4pm to 6pm (CST) from September 2014 on France Musique. The name of the show is a double entendre: it may refer to the Carrefour de l'Odéon, a square in Paris located in the 6th arrondissement, and the last name of the host.

History 
The program name is a pun between the Carrefour de l'Odéon in Paris near the scene of the same name and the surname of Frédéric Lodéon. The show won unprecedented success in the field of classical music, and was awarded the Golden Laurel Club Audiovisual in 1999 and won the Grand Prix. Frédéric Lodéon was named the best radio host in 2001 "Anima 4", awarded by the Community of French-language public radio stations .

Production 
 Producer : Frédéric Lodéon
 Charge of production : Régine Barjou /  Agnès Cathou /  Jean-Charles Diéval
 Production Attachée : Cécile Bonnet des Claustres

General 
The theme song of the credits is from the opening of William Tell composed by Gioacchino Rossini interpreted by the Chamber Orchestra of Europe under the direction of Claudio Abbado.

External links
 Program website, France Inter
 Program website, France Musique
 Radio France

Radio France
French public radio programs
1992 radio programme debuts
Classical music radio programs